The South African Railways Class A 4-8-2T of 1888 is a steam locomotive class from the pre-Union era in the Colony of Natal.

In 1888, the Natal Government Railways placed the first five of its eventual one hundred Class D  steam locomotives in service. The last was delivered in 1899. They were the first locomotives in the world to be built with a  wheel arrangement, later to become known as the Mountain type. In 1912, when these locomotives were assimilated into the South African Railways, they were renumbered and designated Class A. In 1915, another two Class A locomotives were built from spare parts.

Manufacturers
The Natal Government Railways (NGR) Class D  tank locomotive was designed by William Milne, the Locomotive Superintendent of the NGR from 1877 to 1896, and was built by Dübs and Company. These 100 locomotives, initially known on the NGR as the Dübs A, were delivered in ten batches by Dübs between 1888 and 1899.

As far as is known, the Dübs A locomotives were the first in the world to be designed and built with a  wheel arrangement, later to become known as the Mountain type.

Modifications
The performance in service of the Dübs A was gradually improved by various modifications. New boilers were fitted as and when the originals needed replacement, with a working pressure of  instead of the as-delivered  of the first few batches. The coal bunkers were also enlarged and the connecting rod big-ends were changed to the marine type to increase ground clearance.

Another modification was an extended smokebox on most locomotives, such as on NGR no. 87 depicted below. In the 1890s, some improvements to smokebox design took place. Extending the smokebox forward increased its volume. The increased amount of exhaust gases present in the smokebox had the effect of stabilising and improving the draught. The date of this improvement can be pinned to 1891 when the second batch of Michael Stephens’ Cape Government Railways (CGR) 5th Class 4-6-0 locomotives with their lengthened smokeboxes entered service. This had such a profound effect on the boiler’s steaming ability that virtually every locomotive on the CGR and NGR had their smokeboxes extended.

Beginning in 1905, after D.A. Hendrie took over from Reid as Locomotive Superintendent, these locomotives were gradually fitted with Belpaire fireboxes with wider firegrates. The flat-topped Belpaire firebox had the advantage of an increased area of the water-line at the hottest part of the boiler, together with increased steam space over the firebox. The wider firebox required that the water tanks also had to be moved out and the opportunity was taken to enlarge the tanks. The cabs were also improved to offer the engine crew better protection, and new brass-capped chimneys replaced the original straight flared chimneys. These modified locomotives were known as the Improved Dübs A.

When a locomotive classification system was introduced on the NGR, the Dübs A locomotive family was designated Class D. The unmodified locomotives became the Class D1 while the modified locomotives with Belpaire fireboxes became the Class D2.

South African Railways
When the Union of South Africa was established on 31 May 1910, the three Colonial government railways (CGR, NGR and Central South African Railways) were united under a single administration to control and administer the railways, ports and harbours of the Union. Although the South African Railways and Harbours came into existence in 1910, the actual classification and renumbering of all the rolling stock of the three constituent railways was only implemented with effect from 1 January 1912.

In 1912, these engines were designated Class A and were renumbered in the range from 97 to 196, with the unmodified Class D1 locomotives receiving the numbers in the range from 97 to 186 and the ten, at the time, already reboilered Class D2 locomotives receiving the numbers in the range from 187 to 196. In South African Railways (SAR) service, the Improved Dübs A locomotives became known as the Class A Belpaire.

In 1915, to help counter wartime motive power shortages brought about by the diminished ability to order new locomotives from European builders due to hostilities, another two Class A locomotives were built from spare parts by the SAR in their Durban shops. These two locomotives were numbered 332 and 333.

Service
In the NGR era, the Class D fleet remained in service on the Natal mainline until they were eventually displaced by more modern locomotives. They continued to serve well into the SAR era on the Dundee-Hlobane branchline, the Harrismith-Ladysmith section and on the north coast line to Empangeni.

In 1915, shortly after the outbreak of the First World War, the German South West Africa colony was occupied by the Union Defence Forces. Since a large part of the territory's railway infrastructure and rolling stock was destroyed or damaged by retreating German forces, an urgent need arose for locomotives for use on the Cape gauge lines in that territory. In 1917, numbers 98 and 183 were transferred to the Defence Department for service in South West Africa. Both locomotives are believed to have returned to South Africa after the war.

Several locomotives continued to serve in industrial use for many years.

Preservation
Five members of the class survive in preservation.
 Ex NGR No. 84, SAR No. 130 named Patrys, is plinthed at the Reefsteamers Depot in Germiston.
 Ex NGR No. 90, SAR No. 136 named Umbilo, is in the care of the Umgeni Steam Railway.
 Ex NGR No. 55, SAR No. 103, was moved from Witbank to the Outeniqua Transport Museum in George in August 2014.
 Ex NGR No 133, SAR Class A Belpaire no. 196, was plinthed at Masons Mill in Pietermaritzburg until it was repatriated to the United Kingdom in 2011. It is now displayed at the entrance to the Mizens Railway near Woking.
 Ex NGR No. ?, SAR No. 176, on display at Brikor Limited, Olifantsfontein.

Rebuilding to Class 17 4-8-0TT
When a shortage of suitable shunting locomotives developed in 1926, the SAR modified 21 Class A and Class A Belpaire  locomotives by removing the trailing bissel bogie and coal bunker, shortening the main frame and adding a tender to increase their coal and water capacity. Tenders from various scrapped locomotive types were used.

These 21 rebuilt locomotives became the SAR Class 17  tank-and-tender locomotives, numbered in the range from 1415 to 1435. They were used as shunting locomotives around Durban and Port Elizabeth, until they were withdrawn from service by 1961.

Works numbers
The builder's works numbers, years built, NGR and SAR numbers, firebox type and Class 17 numbers are listed in the table.

Illustration
The main picture shows SAR Class A Belpaire no. 196 at Masons Mill on 10 December 2010. Those following illustrate the short and long smokebox versions of the locomotive and some of the post-delivery changes which were made, such as the altered cab for better crew protection.

References

1040
1040
4-8-2 locomotives
2D1 locomotives
4-8-2T locomotives
Dübs locomotives
SAR locomotives
Cape gauge railway locomotives
Railway locomotives introduced in 1888
1888 in South Africa